The Estadio Príncipe Felipe is a football stadium located in Cáceres, Extremadura, Spain. It is currently the home ground of CP Cacereño.

History 
The first game on Estadio Prínce Felipe was played on March 26, 1977.

References

External links 
CP Cacereño Website
Estadios de España 

Football venues in Extremadura
CP Cacereño
Buildings and structures in Cáceres, Spain
Sports venues completed in 1977